Hasan Hazime (born December 23, 1987) is a professional Canadian football defensive lineman who is currently a free agent. He was drafted 36th overall by the Edmonton Eskimos in the 2012 CFL Draft and had his rights traded to the Hamilton Tiger-Cats on February 27, 2013. Hazime then signed with Hamilton on May 23, 2013 and spent three seasons with the club. He signed with the Roughriders as a free agent on February 24, 2016. He played college football for the Wake Forest Demon Deacons.

References

External links
Saskatchewan Roughriders bio 

1987 births
Living people
Canadian football defensive linemen
Hamilton Tiger-Cats players
Wake Forest Demon Deacons football players
People from Pickering, Ontario
Players of Canadian football from Ontario
Saskatchewan Roughriders players